The following is the list of squads for each of the 12 men's and 10 women's teams competing in the 2010 Wheelchair Basketball World Championship, held in Great Britain between July 7 and July 17, 2010. Each team selected a squad of 12 players for the tournament.

Athletes are given an eight-level-score specific to wheelchair basketball, ranging from 0.5 to 4.5. Lower scores represent a higher degree of disability. The sum score of all players on the court cannot exceed 14.

Men

Group A

Head coach: Murray Treseder

Head coach: Malik Abes

Head coach: Yoshiaki Iwasa

Head coach: Piotr Luszynski

Head coach: Sa-Hyun Han

Head coach: James Glatch

Group B

Head coach: Mohamed Tahar Kisrane

Head coach: Ben Ettridge

Head coach: Jerry Tonello

Head coach: Franck Belen

Head coach: Aaron Davila

Head coach: Remzi Sedat Incesu

Women

Group A

Head coach: John Triscari

Head coach: Bill Johnson

Head coach: Garry Peel

Head coach: ?

Head coach: Yvonne Lansink Rotgerink

Group B

Head coach: Ana Teixeira

Head coach: Tiehua Liu

Head coach: Holger Glinicki

Head coach: Tetsuhiro Kikuchi

Head coach: David Kiley

See also
2010 FIBA World Championship squads
2010 FIBA World Championship for Women squads

References

Teams, Official site of the 2010 Wheelchair Basketball World Championship

External links
Official site of the 2010 Wheelchair Basketball World Championship

squad
Basketball squads